is a 1988 action-strategy arcade game later ported to home systems.

Gameplay

In Gain Ground, players control one of a set of characters at a time, each with different weapons. To beat a level, players must reach the exit point with at least one character or destroy all enemies on the level before time runs out. There are forty levels in the arcade version of the game. The Master System and the Genesis/Mega Drive have fifty levels in the game.

Normal mode starts with three players. There are captive characters littered across all levels, which can be rescued by walking over, then escorting the controlled character to the exit point. If a player controlled character is killed, that character turns into a captive, except that they will disappear if the next active player controlled character dies, exits the level without them, or the player has no characters left in their party. In Hard mode, the player starts the game with all twenty characters, but all the captive characters are removed from the levels.

The game is over when all controlled characters in the party are killed without any reaching the exit. However, there are three continues which allow a player to restart the level with their original three characters.

The game consists out of four rounds, each having ten stages, where tenth stage is a boss level. There are also ten completely new levels added to the Genesis/Mega Drive version, this Modern Epoch takes place in the streets of the city.

 Round 1: Dark Ages
 Round 2: Middle Ages
 Round 3: Pre-Revolutionary China
 Round 4: Present day (Mega Drive/Genesis version)
 Round 5: Future
 Round 6: The Final Era (Master System version)

Characters
There are twenty playable characters in Gain Ground, each with their own strengths and weaknesses. Each character has a minor, weak weapon which can be fired in any direction, and a special weapon which has different capabilities from the normal attack and which varies between characters.

The characters in Gain Ground also vary in which hand they hold their weapons, making it easier for some characters to shoot around certain walls and obstacles than others. When selecting a character for a situation, one must consider the character's speed, weapon type and range, and with which hands they hold their weapons.

 "Cyber" seems to be directly inspired by the title character of the Robocop film series, only colored red instead of silver.

 Mars' appearance and use of a bow and arrow have drawn comparisons the title character of the Rambo film series.

 "Robby the Robot" is a subtle reference to the character from the vintage TV show, Lost in Space.

 The "General" has been noted by players to bear more than a passing resemblance to Street Fighter series villain, M. Bison, although the character didn't appear until 1992 after this game's release. Players have nicknamed the character "Bison" due to the name, General, being rather generic.

Plot
From a Gain Ground flyer:

A long period of peace has deprived the earthlings of their instinct to wage war. The Federated Government, greatly concerned regarding this ever increasing dangerous situation, developed a Gain Ground simulation system in the year 2348 in an effort to instigate their ever waning fighting spirit. However, suddenly without warning, the Supercomputer went berserk and took many of the citizens as hostages. In order to rescue the POWs, three of the bravest warriors were urgently dispatched to go forth into the deadly Gain Ground.

Release
Gain Ground started off as an arcade game. Released in Japan, the United States and Canada in 1988, Gain Ground ran on the Sega System 24 architecture. The developers have stated that their original inspiration was Gauntlet. Gain Ground was ported to the Sega Master System in 1990 and the Sega Mega Drive/Genesis in 1991. Renovation Products released the Genesis version in North America. Both conversions were handled by Sanritsu. In 1992, a PC Engine Super CD-ROM² version (Gain Ground SX) was released by NEC Avenue.

It was re-released in Radica Games' TVPlay Legends Vol. II TV Games compilation. In 2004, the game was remade for the PlayStation 2 as part of Sega's Japan-only Sega Ages 2500 series as Sega Ages 2500 Series Vol. 9: Gain Ground. The Mega Drive/Genesis version was released on the European and Australian Wii Virtual Console on February 2, 2007, and was made available in North America on February 5, 2007. Gain Ground was included in Sega Genesis Collection on the PlayStation 2 and the PSP in 2006 and in Sonic's Ultimate Genesis Collection for Xbox 360 and PlayStation 3 in 2009. On June 1, 2010, the game became available on Steam as part of Sega Mega Drive Classics Pack (Sega Genesis Classics in the United States). On May 29, 2018, it was included in the console version of the Mega Drive/Genesis Classics Pack.

As a tribute to the game, Chapter 15 and 17 of the crossover game Project X Zone are stages directly pulled from Gain Ground. Chapter 15's title is "Gain Ground System" and both stages even have the party rescuing three of their companions (two in the first and one in the second) in true fashion to the original game. Incidentally, no characters from Gain Ground actually appear in the crossover.

Reception

Game Machine reports that Gain Ground was among the most popular arcade games of February 1989.

IGN's Levi Buchanan ranked Gain Ground as the fifth top Renovation game. Complex ranked Gain Ground 88th on their "The 100 Best Sega Genesis Games."

Notes

References

External links
Gain Ground at MobyGames

Translation of an interview with Yoshiki Ohka, one of the programmers for Gain Ground, via the Internet Archive.

1988 video games
Arcade video games
Multiplayer and single-player video games
Sanritsu Denki games
Sega arcade games
Sega video games
Master System games
Sega Genesis games
TurboGrafx-CD games
Video games featuring female protagonists
Virtual Console games
Video games developed in Japan